KNID (107.1 FM, "Today's Best Country") is a country music station serving the Enid, Oklahoma, area and is owned by Chisholm Trail Broadcasting, Co. The studios are located in Enid at 316 E. Willow.

External links
Official website

Country radio stations in the United States
NID (FM)
Radio stations established in 1980